Racenisia fimbriipinna is a species of bluntnose knifefish endemic to Venezuela.  This species can reach a length of  TL.  It is the only member of its genus.

References

Hypopomidae
Fish described in 1994
Fish of South America
Taxa named by Francisco Mago Leccia